HSBC Bank may refer to any one of the following principal local banks or divisions of the HSBC Group:

Asia-Pacific
 HSBC (Hong Kong)
 PayMe, its local payment service
 HSBC Bank (China)
 HSBC Bank Australia
 HSBC Bank India
 HSBC Bank Malaysia
 HSBC Sri Lanka
 HSBC Bank (Taiwan)

Europe
 HSBC (United Kingdom)
 M&S Bank, its subsidiary
 First Direct, its direct banking division
 HSBC Continental Europe in the euro area
 HSBC Trinkaus in Germany
 HSBC Bank Malta
 HSBC Bank Polska
 HSBC Bank (Turkey)

Americas
 HSBC Bank USA
 HSBC Finance, a specialized lending subsidiary
 HSBC Bank Argentina
 HSBC Bank Bermuda 
 HSBC Bank Canada
 HSBC Bank (Chile)
 HSBC México
 HSBC Bank Panama

Other geographies
 HSBC Bank Egypt
 HSBC Bank Middle East
 SABB (Saudi bank)
 HSBC Saudi Arabia, joint venture between HSBC and SABB

Global divisions
 HSBC Expat, an offshore banking services provider based in Jersey
 HSBC InvestDirect, an electronic trading platform
 HSBC Private Bank

Others
 Hang Seng Bank, a bank in Hong Kong that is majority-owned by HSBC
 Banco Davivienda El Salvador, formerly HSBC El Salvador
 HSBC Bank Georgia, closed in 2011
 HSBC Bank (Brazil), sold in 2016

~